The 2023 UEFA Women's Futsal Championship, also referred to as UEFA Women's Futsal Euro 2023, is the third edition of the UEFA Women's Futsal Championship, the biennial international futsal championship organised by UEFA for the women's national teams of Europe.

Teams
A total of 24 (out of 55) UEFA member national teams entered the qualifying stage, with Lavia making their debuts. Based on their coefficient ranking, the 12 highest-ranked teams entered the main round, while the 12 lowest-ranked teams entered the preliminary round. Three teams were pre-selected as hosts for the preliminary round and four teams were pre-selected as hosts for the main round.

The draws for the preliminary round and main round was held on 18 February 2022, 14:00 CEST (UTC+2), at the UEFA headquarters in Nyon, Switzerland.

The mechanism of the draws for each round was as follows:
In the preliminary round, the 12 teams were drawn into three groups of four teams each. First, the three teams which were pre-selected as hosts were drawn from their own designated pot and allocated to their respective group as per their seeding positions. Next, the remaining eight teams were drawn from their respective pot which were allocated according to their seeding positions (the lowest-ranked teams were allocated first to seeding position 4, then seeding position 3).
In the main round, the 16 teams were drawn into four groups of four, containing one team from each of the seeding positions 1–4. First, the three teams which were pre-selected as hosts were drawn from their own designated pot and allocated to their respective group as per their seeding positions. Next, the remaining 12 teams were drawn from their respective pot which were allocated according to their seeding positions (including the three preliminary round winners, whose identity was not known at the time of the draw, which were allocated to seeding position 4). Based on the decisions taken by the UEFA Emergency Panel, Spain and Gibraltar could not be drawn in the same group. Should Gibraltar qualify for the main round, and were drawn into the same group as Spain, they would be swapped with the relevant team from the next available group.

Notes
Teams marked in bold have qualified for the final tournament.
(H):  Teams pre-selected as hosts for the preliminary round and the main round

Format
In the preliminary round and main round, each group is played as a round-robin mini-tournament at the pre-selected hosts.

In the final tournament, the four qualified teams play in knockout format (semi-finals, third place match, and final), either at a host selected by UEFA from one of the teams, or at a neutral venue.

Tiebreakers
In the preliminary round and main round, teams are ranked according to points (3 points for a win, 1 point for a draw, 0 points for a loss), and if tied on points, the following tiebreaking criteria are applied, in the order given, to determine the rankings (Regulations Articles 14.01 and 14.02):
Points in head-to-head matches among tied teams;
Goal difference in head-to-head matches among tied teams;
Goals scored in head-to-head matches among tied teams;
If more than two teams are tied, and after applying all head-to-head criteria above, a subset of teams are still tied, all head-to-head criteria above are reapplied exclusively to this subset of teams;
Goal difference in all group matches;
Goals scored in all group matches;
Penalty shoot-out if only two teams have the same number of points, and they met in the last round of the group and are tied after applying all criteria above (not used if more than two teams have the same number of points, or if their rankings are not relevant for qualification for the next stage);
Disciplinary points (red card = 3 points, yellow card = 1 point, expulsion for two yellow cards in one match = 3 points);
UEFA coefficient ranking.

Preliminary round
The winners of each group and the two best runners-up advance to the Main Round to join the 11 teams which receive byes. 

Originally, Russia received a bye to the Main Round and only the best runners-up would advance to the Main Round. On 2 May 2022, UEFA replaced Russia with the second best-ranked runner-up of the Preliminary Round due to the Russian invasion of Ukraine.

Times are CEST (UTC+2), as listed by UEFA (local times, if different, are in parentheses).

Group A

Group B

Group C

Ranking of second-placed teams
To determine the best runner-up, only the results of the runner-up teams against the first and third-placed teams in their group are taken into account.

Main round
The winners of each group advance to the final tournament. 

Times are CEST (UTC+2), as listed by UEFA (local times, if different, are in parentheses).

Group 1

Group 2

Group 3

Group 4

Final tournament
The final tournament will be played 17 – 19 March 2023

Qualified teams
The following four teams qualify for the final tournament.

1 Bold indicates champions for that year. Italic indicates hosts for that year.

Squads
Each national team have to submit a squad of 14 players, two of whom must be goalkeepers.

Bracket
In the semi-finals and final, extra time and penalty shoot-out are used to decide the winner if necessary; however, no extra time is used in the third place match (Regulations Article 16.02 and 16.03).

References

External links

Women's Futsal Euro Matches: 2021–22, UEFA.com

2023
2021–22 in European futsal
2022–23 in European futsal
2022 in women's association football
2023 in women's association football
Sports events affected by the 2022 Russian invasion of Ukraine
May 2022 sports events in Europe
October 2022 sports events in Europe
March 2023 sports events in Hungary